Al Shatrah Stadium (Arabic: ملعب الشطرة) is a multi-purpose stadium in Dhi Qar, Iraq. It is currently used mostly for football matches and serves as the home stadium of Shatra FC and Al-Nasiriya FC. The stadium holds 7,500 people.

The stadium was inaugurated on 3 January 2016 with a ceremony consisting of sports activities and shows performed by local athletes from Al-Shatrah district.

See also 
List of football stadiums in Iraq

References

Football venues in Iraq
Athletics (track and field) venues in Iraq
Multi-purpose stadiums in Iraq
2016 establishments in Iraq
Sports venues completed in 2016